Around the World Hit Singles: The Journey So Far is the first greatest hits compilation by East 17. It was released on 4 November 1996 and has been certified 2× Platinum in the UK.

Track listing 
"House of Love [Pedigree Mix]"
"Deep [Breath Mix]"
"It's Alright [Guvnor Mix]"
"Stay Another Day [S.A.D. Mix]"
"Steam [Vapoureyes Mix]"
"Let It Rain [Thunder Radio Edit]"
"Slow It Down [Perpetual Motion]"
"If You Ever" (with Gabrielle)
"West End Girls [Faces on Posters Mix]"
"Around The World [Ourworld Master 7" inch]"
"Thunder [Radio Edit]"
"Gold [7" Collar Size]"
"Do U Still [Single Remix]"
"Someone To Love [Summer of Love Mix]"
"Hey Child"
"Hold My Body Tight [7" Radio Edit]"
"Stay Another Day [Less Sad Mix]"

Limited Edition Bonus Mix CD 
"Let It Rain" (Overworld Storm Mix)
"Hold My Body Tight" (Danny Tenaglia Vocal Mix)
"House of Love" (Wet Nose Dub)
"Deep" (Delta Steam House of Funk Mix)
"Gold" (Paws on the Floor)
"Do U Still?" (Wildchild Vocal Mix)
"Steam" (Overworld Haze Mix)
"Deep" (Throat Mix)
"Let It Rain" (Part One Low Pressure Remix)
"Slow It Down" (Speed It Up)

Charts and certifications

Charts

Certifications

References

External links 
Amazon.co.uk East 17: Around The World Hit Singles: The Journey So Far

East 17 compilation albums
1996 compilation albums
London Records compilation albums